Kashmirosaurus is an extinct genus of temnospondyl amphibian known from Permo-Carboniferous deposits in the region of Kashmir. It was originally named by English paleontologist Arthur Smith Woodward in 1905 as a species of Archegosaurus called Archegosaurus ornatus. More recently, the species has been recognized as being distinct from Archegosaurus, and it was placed in its own genus Kashmirosaurus in 1996. An additional species of Archegosaurus, A. kashmiriensis, was named in 1960 from the same deposits in Kashmir, and is now considered synonymous with Kashmirosaurus ornatus.

Phylogeny
Below is a cladogram modified from Ruta et al. (2007) showing the relationship of Kashmirosaurus to other archegosauroids:

References

Carboniferous temnospondyls
Permian temnospondyls of Asia
Prehistoric amphibians of Asia
Prehistoric amphibian genera
Permian India
Carboniferous India